Osmanvand Rural District is a rural district (dehestan) in Firuzabad District, Kermanshah County, Kermanshah Province, Iran. At the 2006 census, its population was 4,654, in 982 families. The rural district has 46 villages.

References 

Rural Districts of Kermanshah Province
Kermanshah County